Coming 2 America is a 2021 American romantic comedy film that serves as a sequel to the 1988 film Coming to America starring Eddie Murphy and directed by Craig Brewer, from a screenplay by Kenya Barris, Barry W. Blaustein, and David Sheffield, and a story by Blaustein, Sheffield, and Justin Kanew, based on characters was created by Murphy. It co-stars Arsenio Hall, Jermaine Fowler, Leslie Jones, Tracy Morgan, KiKi Layne, Shari Headley, Teyana Taylor, Wesley Snipes, and James Earl Jones. Coming 2 America was the final film appearance of Louie Anderson before his death in 2022, who reprising his role as Maurice from the first film.

Originally to be theatrically released by Paramount Pictures, the film's distribution rights were sold to Amazon Studios because of the COVID-19 pandemic. Amazon released it digitally via Amazon Prime Video on March 4, 2021. Coming 2 America received mixed reviews from critics. Like its predecessor, the film earned a nomination at the 94th Academy Awards for Best Makeup and Hairstyling.

Plot
On the 30th anniversary of his wedding with Lisa McDowell at the end of the first film, Prince Akeem of Zamunda is summoned before his dying father King Jaffe Joffer. Jaffe and his shaman Baba reveal to a baffled Akeem that he had sired a bastard son during his first visit to Queens, New York many years ago, after his aide and long-time friend Semmi had enticed two women into spending the night with them while Akeem was still searching for his future queen, resulting in a tryst he did not remember. Realizing that Semmi is the one who asked one of women to have sex and drugged him in the first place, Akeem briefly strangles Semmi. As Zamundian tradition demands that only a male successor can inherit the throne, and Akeem has fathered only daughters, he is forced to travel back to Queens to retrieve his son. If not, Zamunda could face a hostile takeover by Zamunda's militaristic neighbor nation Nexdoria, whose dictator, General Izzi (the brother of Imani, Akeem's original arranged bride-to-be), has been pushing for Akeem's eldest daughter Meeka to marry his foppish son, Idi.

Following King Jaffe's funeral and Akeem's ascension to the throne, he and Semmi travel back to Queens to find his illegitimate son. During a light-hearted reunion with the barbershop gang they bonded with years earlier, head barber Mr. Clarence informs them that the son in question is Lavelle Junson, a ticket scalper who hustles outside of Madison Square Garden. After an awkward reunion with Lavelle's mother Mary, Akeem takes them back to Zamunda, much to his family's displeasure. When General Izzi learns of this, he drops by to introduce his daughter Bopoto to Lavelle as a last shot at laying claim to the throne of Zamunda, but in order to qualify as a royal prince, Lavelle first has to pass a series of traditional - and hazardous - tests.

Lavelle is at first highly reluctant to place himself in danger, but then bonds with Mirembe, a royal groomer, who tells him of Akeem's quest to find his queen and encourages him to follow his own path. Lavelle then invites his uncle Reem, Mary's streetwise brother, to Zamunda. He coaches him on how to blend his urban upbringing with his new royal status. Lavelle gradually develops an understanding with Akeem's family and, using his wits and some forced courage, he passes and is made Prince of Zamunda. However, at his accession party, Lavelle overhears a conversation between Akeem and Izzi which makes him believe that Akeem is just exploiting him, and he, Mirembe, Mary and Reem go back to New York. Upset at losing Mary, whom she has befriended, Lisa locks Akeem out of their bedroom. After a pep talk from his father-in-law Cleo, who reminds him of the late Queen Aoleon's progressive mind, Akeem flies back to the States, while Semmi is left to stall Izzi, who intends to return the next day to either see Bopoto marry Lavelle or declare war.

Returning to Queens, Akeem finds that Lavelle and Mirembe are about to get married. Confronted by Lavelle and reminded of his own life story, he gives them his blessing and releases Lavelle from his marriage to Bopoto. When Mirembe expresses reluctance in the couple cutting all of their ties to Zamunda, Akeem offers to fly Mary's family back for a proper wedding. In the meantime, Semmi and the princesses, all trained staff fighters, fight off and subdue General Izzi when he invades the palace, forcing him to try a more diplomatic approach. Upon his return home, Akeem changes the royal succession by allowing his daughter Meeka to ascend to the throne upon his death, while Lavelle is made an ambassador to the United States, and General Izzi has opened Nexdoria for a peaceful political and trading relationship with Zamunda. The film concludes with a grand party at the royal palace to celebrate Lavelle and Mirembe's marriage, including the barbers from Queens as special guests and a performance of the song "We Are Family" from Sexual Chocolate.

Cast

Production

Development
In January 2017, an announcement was publicized which addressed the impending production of a sequel to the original film, Coming to America. Kevin Misher was named as producer, and David Sheffield and Barry W. Blaustein, the original screenwriters, were also attached to the project. However, a possible participation of lead actors Eddie Murphy and Arsenio Hall was left undefined.

Casting
On January 11, 2019, it was announced that the sequel would be moving forward with Murphy reprising his role, and Craig Brewer as director (having previously worked with Murphy on the Netflix film Dolemite Is My Name). Arsenio Hall, Shari Headley, John Amos, Paul Bates, and James Earl Jones were expected to return for the sequel as well. Wesley Snipes signed on for a role in the film, later revealed to be General Izzi, the son of Colonel Izzi and older brother of Imani from the first film. Leslie Jones and rapper Rick Ross also joined the cast in undisclosed roles.

On June 18, 2019, Jermaine Fowler was cast in the film in a starring role. On August 12, 2019, it was confirmed that Shari Headley would reprise her role as love interest Lisa McDowell. On August 21, 2019, Nomzamo Mbatha, Tracy Morgan, KiKi Layne, Luenell, Rotimi, Teyana Taylor, and Michael Blackson were added to the cast, alongside returning actors Louie Anderson, Vanessa Bell Calloway, and Garcelle Beauvais. Madge Sinclair, who played Akeem's mother Queen Aoleon in the original film, died in December 1995; her character was not recast, but is featured in archive footage. In September 2019, Davido had been cast in a cameo role in the film.

In October 2019, Samuel L. Jackson, who briefly appeared in the original film, was confirmed to not be reprising his role in the sequel due to scheduling conflicts. Murphy said that if Jackson had been available for the cameo, his character would be again featured robbing the McDowells restaurant. In December 2019, Morgan Freeman and Bella Murphy were cast in undisclosed roles. In October 2019, Eriq La Salle stated that he will not reprise his role of Darryl Jenks from the original film due to scheduling conflicts. In February 2021, Murphy stated that if the character of Darryl Jenks had returned, there could have been a romance with Patrice McDowell (portrayed by Allison Dean) due to the events at the end of the original film.

Filming
Principal photography began on August 17, 2019, in Atlanta, Georgia, with 
Joe Williams serving as cinematographer. Rick Ross confirmed during the same month that his Georgia mansion would be used as a location in the film. On October 1, 2019, in an interview with Collider, Murphy confirmed that production on Beverly Hills Cop IV would commence after the filming of Coming 2 America has wrapped. Filming officially wrapped on November 9, 2019. Due to his age, James Earl Jones did not travel to the set or film his scenes with Murphy.

Music
The film's soundtrack was released through Def Jam Recordings on March 5, 2021. In February 2021, Bobby Sessions and Megan Thee Stallion released "I'm a King" as its lead single. The soundtrack also features other songs by various artists, including Big Sean, John Legend, Teyana Taylor, YG, Davido, Gladys Knight, Burna Boy, and Salt-N-Pepa.

Track listing
 "Gett Off" - Teyana Taylor featuring Jermaine Fowler and Brandon Rogers
 "I'm A King" - Bobby Sessions and Megan Thee Stallion
 "We Got the Moves" - Beau Young Prince
 "Koroba" - Tiwa Savage
 "Go Big" - YG featuring Big Sean
 "Smash the Crowd" - Public Enemy featuring Ice-T and PMD
 "Assurance" - Davido
 "Waka Waka" - Tekno
 "Midnight Train from Zamunda" - Gladys Knight
 "Whatta King/We Are Family Mashup" - En Vogue, Salt-N-Pepa, Randy Watson and Sexual Chocolate
 "These Streets" - Mi Casa
 "Coming 2 America" - John Legend and Burna Boy featuring Nile Rodgers

Release

Streaming
Coming 2 America was released by Amazon Prime Video on March 4, 2021, one day earlier than was announced. The film was initially scheduled to be theatrically released by Paramount Pictures on August 7, 2020, but was pushed back to December 18, 2020, before the COVID-19 pandemic began. On November 20, 2020, Amazon Studios acquired the distribution rights to the film for $125 million.

Following its release, Amazon claimed the film had the best opening weekend of any streaming film since March 2020. Nielsen later reported that the film totaled 1.4 billion minutes-watched over its first week of release (equaling 1.27 million complete views of the film), the first time a Prime Original topped the company's charts.

Home media
The film was released on Blu-ray on March 8, 2022, by Paramount Home Entertainment.

Reception

Critical response
On review aggregator Rotten Tomatoes, the film holds an approval rating of 49% based on 249 reviews with an average rating of 5.4/10. The website's critics consensus reads, "Decades after its predecessor joked about the fine line between love and nausea, Coming 2 America reminds audiences that there's an equally fine line between sequel and retread." On Metacritic, the film has a weighted average score of 52 out of 100 based on 47 critics, indicating "mixed or average reviews".

Cassie Da Costa of Vanity Fair reviewed the film unfavourably, writing that it is "startling in its utter incompetence" and "uses half-baked internet-era discourse as a substitute for meaningful or even entertaining cultural commentary". Writing for The Guardian, critic Peter Bradshaw stated that "the movie is as tired and middle-aged as Akeem [the leading character] himself". Peter Debruge of Variety said "For the most part, Coming 2 America falls back on familiar punchlines, serving up nearly word-for-word repeats of amusing bits from the original, but they don't necessarily play the same in this context."

Melanie McFarland of Salon gave the film a favorable review, writing that it "honors its predecessor" and overcomes some of the original film's datedness, by utilizing "more equitable comedy that skewers outdated patriarchal traditions." Mick LaSalle of the San Francisco Chronicle praised Eddie Murphy's performance, saying, "When he brings his dramatic capacities to comic roles, he's really at his best and most original. It's strange, these movies that create a warm feeling. It's hard to say why or how it feels like the summation of the three decades of virtuosic silliness that Murphy has brought to the screen, and of all that has meant to us."

The film garnered controversy due to a scene that depicted a date rape towards an unconscious male in a humorous fashion with many viewers taking to Twitter to protest it.

Accolades

References

External links

 

2021 films
2021 romantic comedy films
2020s American films
2020s buddy comedy films
2020s English-language films
African-American comedy films
African-American films
Amazon Prime Video original films
Amazon Studios films
American buddy comedy films
American romantic comedy films
American sequel films
Coming to America (film series)
Films about royalty
Films about sexism
Films directed by Craig Brewer
Films not released in theaters due to the COVID-19 pandemic
Films postponed due to the COVID-19 pandemic
Films set in Africa
Films set in a fictional country
Films set in Queens, New York
Films shot in Atlanta
Films with screenplays by Barry W. Blaustein
Films with screenplays by David Sheffield
Films with screenplays by Kenya Barris
Monarchy in fiction
Paramount Pictures films